Marsenina stearnsii is a species of small slug-like sea snail, a marine gastropod mollusc in the subfamily Lamellariinae of the family Velutinidae.

Description
The thin, translucent white shell is visible through a dorsal pore in the mantle. The finely pitted mantle is white to pale pink with darker spots.

Distribution
This white slug-like snail is known from Alaska and central California.  It can be found in the rocky intertidal, often in association with the ascidian Trididemnum opacum. It is relatively rare, found in the low rocky intertidal, usually under rocks on the ascidian Trididemnem opacum which it matches in color and pattern and upon which it preys.

References 

 Turgeon, D.; Quinn, J.F.; Bogan, A.E.; Coan, E.V.; Hochberg, F.G.; Lyons, W.G.; Mikkelsen, P.M.; Neves, R.J.; Roper, C.F.E.; Rosenberg, G.; Roth, B.; Scheltema, A.; Thompson, F.G.; Vecchione, M.; Williams, J.D. (1998). Common and scientific names of aquatic invertebrates from the United States and Canada: mollusks. 2nd ed. American Fisheries Society Special Publication, 26. American Fisheries Society: Bethesda, MD (USA). . IX, 526 + cd-rom pp.
 ITIS info, authority and date

External links
 

Velutinidae
Gastropods described in 1871